Tulio Enrique León (October 11, 1938 ‒ March 18, 1982) was a Venezuelan organist, composer, and arranger. Born in Maracaibo, Venezuela, he would become one of Venezuela's most popular artists and would bear the title, El Artista del Teclado.

Biography
Tulio Enrique was attracted by music from an early age when he used to create, according to him, turntables, making a cornet from cardboard, on which he put a sewing machine needle, sliding on a disk, to get sound.

In 1947, after his eyesight was examined in the United States by the Spanish ophthalmologist, Ramón Castroviejo, he was diagnosed with blindness due to optic nerve atrophy. The doctor, in light of the finality of the disease, recommended that he use the money for the surgery to buy a piano and learn to play. Having done this Tulio Enrique's confidence was restored and the doors to his musical career were opened.

Tulio Enrique's obsession was playing the organ, as he frequently listened to Radio Caracas, which presented the Panamanian organist Salvador Muñoz. He decided to sell the piano, acquiring a Hammond organ and devoted himself to its study and practice.

Tulio Enrique Leon parents were Natividad Ordonez del Castillo and Tulio Enrique León Gonzalez.

Musical career
In 1961, Tulio Enrique traveled to Caracas and performed on Venevision without any artistic references or any kind of recommendation, after being heard. He was hired to debut in a musical called Show de Show (Show of Shows) playing a tune that his audience always asked for: Manzanares river. On succeeding in the capital, a new Venezuelan artist was born with a bright and  promising artistic career in music. El Show de Renny (The Renny Show), La Feria de la Alegria (The Happiness Fair), Sábado Sensacional (Sensational Saturday) were the scenes that strengthened the career of this Zuliano citizen. The hit songs from Tulio Enrique León made him an international star. He managed to be placed as an exclusive artist of Discomoda label, at number 61 among the 100 best artists in the world, according to Billboard's April 17, 1965 charts.

Hits
Tulio Enrique's success traveled the world, he was an idol not only in his native country, but also beyond. In Argentina he was hired by the Odeon label with whom he recorded several albums. Hits like La Pollera Amarilla (The Yellow Skirt), Ron y Tabaco (Rum and Tobacco), El Cable Submarino (The Submarine Cable), La Pegajosa (The Sticky), Este es el Ritmo (This is the Rhythm) and others, were delirious to those who listened. Americas, Asia and Europe enjoyed the songs performed by León during his musical career in his short lifetime.

Discography

1938 births
1982 deaths
Venezuelan organists
Venezuelan male composers
People from Maracaibo
20th-century composers
20th-century organists
20th-century male musicians